Chaplygin (masculine) or Chaplygina (feminine or masculine genitive) is the name of several inhabited localities in Russia.

Urban localities
Chaplygin, Lipetsk Oblast, a town in Chaplyginsky District of Lipetsk Oblast; administratively incorporated as a town under district jurisdiction

Rural localities
Chaplygin, Krasnodar Krai, a khutor in Soyuz Chetyrekh Khutorov Rural Okrug of Gulkevichsky District of Krasnodar Krai
Chaplygina, Kursk Oblast, a village in Pashkovsky Selsoviet of Kursky District of Kursk Oblast
Chaplygina, Oryol Oblast, a village in Bagrinovsky Selsoviet of Bolkhovsky District of Oryol Oblast